The Commander, Kenya Army is the chief and highest-ranking officer of the Kenya Army The current commander is Lieutenant general Peter Mbogo Njiru.

List of officeholders

References

 
 
 
 
 
 
Kenya Yearbook 2010, pp430
https://intelligencebriefs.com/tag/kenya-army-command/

Kenyan military personnel
Kenya